The women's 5000 meter at the 2016 KNSB Dutch Single Distance Championships took place in Heerenveen at the Thialf ice skating rink on Sunday 29 December 2015. Although this tournament was held in 2015, it was part of the 2015–2016 speed skating season.

There were 12 participants.

Title holder was Carien Kleibeuker.

Result

  WDR = Withdrew

Source:

References

Single Distance Championships
2016 Single Distance
World